Wigwam Mills is a hosiery company based in Sheboygan, Wisconsin, United States.

History

Wigwam Mills was founded in 1905 by Herbert Chesebro, Robert Ehany, and Lawerance Bentz in Sheboygan, Wisconsin, a year after the Sheboygan Knitting Company burned to the ground. All three founders were employees of the company and purchased equipment and recruited employees from their former company. The new company was founded under the name "Hand Knit Hosiery Company." It made socks and headwear, primarily from wool, for the residents and lumbermen of the area. At the time the company was supplied by numerous nearby wool mills.

By 1922, Herbert Chesebro gained partial control of the company after purchasing Bentz's share. The company flourished under Chesebro.

When the stock market crashed, the hosiery industry struggled in the difficult economy of the Great Depression. After Herbert's death, the company had bank loans totaling $100,000. With the help of J.W. Hansen of the Citizens Bank, the company stayed in business.

In 1936, Robert Chesebro, Sr. gained complete control of the company after working at the company for 12 years.

The company devoted up to 75% of its capacity to knitting for the troops overseas. By 1945 the company had expanded its line to include baseball hosiery, anklets, hockey caps, mittens, and socks for all types of activities.

The company prospered for the next 65 years knitting socks, headwear, and other knit products. On January 1, 1957, the company changed its name from Hand-Knit Hosiery to Wigwam Mills, based on the popularity of the brand.

The company continued under the leadership of Robert Chesebro, Sr., and eventually the third generation of ownership, Robert Chesebro, Jr.

The 1980s saw growth in many areas for Wigwam. A new logo and more technical synthetic fibers were becoming more specialized. Wigwam developed the Poly-Wool line of performance socks as well as the overnight success—Moraine.

From the mid-1980s through the late 1990s the Wigwam 622 slouch socks became very popular. They were worn by kids, tweens, teens, college students and adults. Not only as athletic wear but everyday fashions too. Rolling one's jeans and khakis to show off the slouch socks, wearing the socks over skinny jeans, ankle length skirts and dresses, and  ankle length cotton pants, both styles since they stopped at the ankle showed off the socks, were popular styles. Also two other very popular styles were one wearing the socks over leggings with Keds or boat shoes with oversized tees, oversized sweaters, an oversized sweater or oversized sweatshirt over a turtleneck. And two wearing the white color of the socks over opaque tights with a babydoll or skater dress and white Keds or in warmer weather with bike shorts showing from under the babydoll or skater dress with the white Keds.

In the 1990s, the company developed the Ultimax and INgenious brands. Each featured a patented sock technology. In 2007, both brands were brought under the Wigwam brand umbrella. Ultimax became Wigwam Pro and INgenious became Wigwam Fusion.

In 2020 Chris Chesebro and Margaret Newhard, siblings, took over the helm of the company from their father Robert Chesebro, Jr.

Later in 2021 Wigwam was awarded a patent for a custom fitting socks, more shaped to the true anatomical shape of a foot compared to other socks.

In 2022 Wigwam became the official sock of the US Ski and Snowboard Team.

See also

List of sock manufacturers

References

External links
 Wigwam Mills

Companies based in Wisconsin
Manufacturing companies based in Wisconsin
Sheboygan, Wisconsin
Hosiery brands
Socks